Bernd Nickel (15 March 1949 – 27 October 2021) was a German professional footballer who played as an attacking midfielder or striker. Due to his straight shots his nickname was "Doktor Hammer".

Nickel began his career in 1957 at SV Eisemroth. In 1966 he was signed by Eintracht Frankfurt, where he scored 141 goals in 426 Bundesliga games. He won the DFB-Pokal in 1974, 1975 and 1981. His biggest success was the victory of the UEFA Cup in 1980. Frankfurt won against Borussia Mönchengladbach with 2–3 (away) and 1–0 (home) on aggregate due to the UEFA away goals' rule. Nickel stayed until 1983 at the Eintracht. He was notorious for his heavy distance shots and free kicks.

Nickel scored four Olympico goals (goals scored direct from a corner kick) from all four corners of Eintracht's Waldstadion.

At the end of his career he joined BSC Young Boys from Switzerland for the 1983–84 season.

Nickel was capped once for the DFB team. He also competed for West Germany at the 1972 Summer Olympics.

Honours

Club
Eintracht Frankfurt
 DFB-Pokal: 1973–74, 1974–75, 1980–81
 UEFA Cup: 1979–80

References

External links
 
 
 
 

1949 births
2021 deaths
Association football midfielders
Association football forwards
German footballers
Germany international footballers
Germany B international footballers
Eintracht Frankfurt players
BSC Young Boys players
Bundesliga players
Olympic footballers of West Germany
West German footballers
Footballers at the 1972 Summer Olympics
UEFA Cup winning players
People from Lahn-Dill-Kreis
Sportspeople from Giessen (region)
Footballers from Hesse
West German expatriate sportspeople in Switzerland
West German expatriate footballers